The Jim Durrell Recreation Centre is a multi-purpose dual-pad arena in Ottawa, Ontario, Canada. It is located in the south end of the city on Walkley road close to the intersection of Bank street. The Ottawa Jr. Senators of the Central Canada Hockey League are its primary tenant.

History
The Jim Durrell Recreation Centre started off as the Walkley Arena.  It was the second City of Ottawa owned arena after the Elmgrove Park Arena in the west end. City council debated on whether to build two arenas but ultimately decided to start with the one on Walkley first and then build their third arena on a lot they owned at the intersections of Chamberlain and Lyon. Initial costs for the new arena were to be $170,000 but increased by $30,000 by November 1962 when work began. Strangely enough, the City saved somewhere between $5,000 to $15,000 by not installing showers in the four dressing rooms.  The contract was awarded to Abel Construction, and the architectural firm was J.L. Richards and Associates.
Several names were proposed for the new arena, among them were, Senator's Memorial Arena, Colonel By Arena and Billings Arena, the Silver Seven Stadium (to commemorate the Silver Seven hockey team which won the Stanley Cup in 1903, 1904 and 1905), but it was eventually decided to simply keep it as Walkley Arena.

In January 1984, 300 residents of Ottawa South presented the a petition to city planners requesting a new arena be built to help with the 2000 hockey and ringette players and figure skaters. Ald. Brian Bourns considered a $2-to $3-million arena far too expensive and thought doubling Walkley Arena was the better solution.

Facilities

Notable events

Directions

See also

References

Indoor arenas in Ontario
Indoor ice hockey venues in Canada
Sports venues in Ottawa
1962 establishments in Ontario
Sports venues completed in 1962